The 2007 William & Mary Tribe football team represented the College of William & Mary as member of South Division of the Colonial Athletic Association (CAA) during the 2007 NCAA Division I FCS football season. Led by Jimmye Laycock in his 28th year as head coach, William & Mary finished the season with an overall record of 4–7 and a mark of 2–6 in A-10 play, placing fifth in the South Division.

Schedule

References

William and Mary
William & Mary Tribe football seasons
William and Mary Tribe football